The First Secretary of the Chechen-Ingush regional branch of the Communist Party of the Soviet Union was the position of highest authority in the Chechen AO (1922–34), Chechen-Ingush AO (1934–36), Chechen-Ingush ASSR (1936–44, 1957–91) and the Grozny Oblast (1944–57) in the Russian SFSR of the Soviet Union. The position was created in November 1922, and abolished on August 23, 1991. The First Secretary was a de facto appointed position usually by the Politburo or the General Secretary himself.

List of First Secretaries of the Chechen-Ingush Communist Party

Notes

Sources
 World Statesmen.org

1922 establishments in the Soviet Union
1991 disestablishments in the Soviet Union
Chechen-Ingush
Politics of Chechnya
Politics of Ingushetia